The Flintstones' New Neighbors is a 1980 animated television special and the first of The Flintstone Special limited-run prime time revival of The Flintstones produced by Hanna-Barbera Productions. The special premiered on NBC on September 26, 1980.

The Flintstones' New Neighbors was animated at Filman, an animation studio in Madrid, Spain (headed by Carlos Alfonso and Juan Pina) who did a lot of animation work for Hanna-Barbera between the early 1970s through the mid-1980s. This would explain why, artistically, the backgrounds in this special look very much like pencil and charcoal drawings, very different from the original series and its spin-offs.

Like many animated series created by Hanna-Barbera in the 1970s, the show contained a laugh track created by the studio, one of the last productions to do so.

Summary
The Flintstones and the Rubbles welcome a new strange family, The Frankenstones, to their Bedrock neighborhood.

The Frankenstones
The Frankenstone family featured on this special was a different version of the Frankenstones from the episode "Fred & Barney Meet the Frankenstones" of The New Fred and Barney Show (1979).

The new Frankenstone family members are:
 Frank Frankenstone
 Oblivia Frankenstone, his wife
 Hidea Frankenstone, their daughter
 Stubby Frankenstone, their son

A friendship develops between the Flintstones and the Frankenstones, not unlike the rivalry that would be depicted later between Fred and Frank on The Flintstone Comedy Show. This version of the Frankenstones continued to appear throughout the run of the specials.

Voice cast
 Henry Corden as Fred Flintstone
 Mel Blanc as Barney Rubble
 Jean Vander Pyl as Wilma Flintstone, Pebbles Flintstone
 Gay Autterson as Betty Rubble
 Don Messick as Bamm-Bamm Rubble
 John Stephenson as Frank Frankenstone
 Patricia Parris as Oblivia Frankenstone
 Jim MacGeorge as Stubby Frankenstone
 Julie McWhirter as Hidea Frankenstone
 Frank Welker as Creepy, Mother Pterodactyl

Award nomination
The Flintstones' New Neighbors was nominated for Outstanding Individual Achievement - Animated Programming at the 33rd Primetime Emmy Awards in 1981.

Production credits
 Executive in Charge of Production: Margaret Loesch
 Director: Carl Urbano
 Story: Willie Gilbert
 Story Direction: Alex Lovy
 Recording Director: Alex Lovy
 Voices: Gay Autterson, Mel Blanc, Henry Corden, Jim MacGeorge, Julie McWhirter, Don Messick, Pat Parris, John Stephenson, Jean Vander Pyl, Frank Welker
 Graphics: Iraj Paran, Tom Wogatzke
 Musical Director: Hoyt Curtin
 Musical Supervisor: Paul DeKorte
 Character Design: Bob Singer, Don Morgan
 Layout: Angel Izquierdo
 Animation: Alberto Conejo, Julio Diez, Miguel A. Fuertes, Manuel G. Galiana, Roberto Marcano, Matias Marcos, Ezequiel Martin, Pedro Mohedano, Pedro J. Molina, Mariano Rueda
 Backgrounds: Francisco Albert, Marcial Del Cerro, Andres Hernandez
 Xerography: Javier Alfonso, Jose A. Moreno
 Ink and Paint Supervision: Carmen Moreno
 Sound Direction: Richard Olson
 Camera:' Raul Garcia, Santiago Gomez
 Supervising Film Editor: Larry C. Cowan
 Film Editor: Emiliano Diaz
 Dubbing Supervisor: Pat Foley
 Music Editors: Joe Sandusky, Terry Moore
 Effects Editors: Daniels McLean, Cecil Broughton, Michael Bradley, Catherine McKenzie
 Show Editor: Gil Iverson
 Negative Consultant: William E. DeBoer
 Production Supervisors: Carlos Alfonso, Juan Pina
 Post Production Supervisor: Joed Eaton
 Producer: Alex Lovy
 Executive Producers: Joseph Barbera and William Hanna
 It was made under the jurisdiction of IATSE-IA affiliated with the A.F.L.-C.I.O.
 © 1980 Hanna-Barbera Productions, Inc.

Home media
The Flintstones' New Neighbors was included as a bonus episode on the 1989 VHS release of The Flintstones Meet Rockula and Frankenstone.

On October 9, 2012, Warner Archive released The Flintstones' New Neighbors on DVD in region 1 as part of their Hanna–Barbera Classics Collection, in a release entitled The Flintstones Prime-Time Specials Collection: Volume 2.  It was a Manufacture-on-Demand release, available exclusively through Warner's online store and Amazon.com.

References

External links
 
 

1980 television specials
1980s animated television specials
NBC television specials
1980s American television specials
The Flintstones television specials
Hanna-Barbera television specials
Films directed by Carl Urbano
1980s English-language films